Xingyun may refer to:

Hsing Yun (1927–2023), Chinese Buddhist monk based in Taiwan
Xingyun (group), Chinese e-commerce company
Xingyun Lake, lake in Yunnan, China